The Mercedes-AMG SL (model code R232) is the seventh-generation of the Mercedes-Benz SL-Class roadster, replacing the R231 model. Marketed under the Mercedes-AMG branding, it was presented on 28 October 2021, following a preview of interior on 14 July 2021. The R232 is no longer sold under Mercedes-Benz as it has become exclusive to Mercedes-AMG and a direct replacement for the GT Roadster.

Specifications 
The R232 represents several departures from the previous SL-Class predecessors. Switching from a folding metal roof and heavy hydraulic system, as featured in the previous R230 and R231 generations,  to a fabric-lined roof and electric motors saves  and lowers the center of gravity for improved handling. A first for the SL-Class, the R232 is fitted with AMG Performance 4MATIC+, all-wheel-drive system, and rear-axle steering.

On 14 July 2021, Mercedes-Benz released photos of the interior and dashboard. The R232 reintroduced the 2+2 seating as standard since the C107 and R129, which had the optional 2+2 seating installed by the dealer. The rear seats are optimal for passengers whose height is up to 1.5 meters. The dashboard is symmetrical, along with the 12.3-inch digital instrument cluster and an 11.9-inch touchscreen panel in the center. The instrument cluster is placed within a binnacle to reduce the reflections from the sunlight and improve visibility when the roof is folded down. The touchscreen panel in the center is electronically tiltable to the vertical position for the same reason.

At the launch, the sole engine option is a biturbo 4.0-litre V8 with two different levels of output: SL 55 4MATIC+ and SL 63 4MATIC+. The lesser SL 55 is rated at  &  while the SL 63 trumps that with  & . The base six-cylinder inline engine and a more powerful hybrid version of the V8 engine are to be introduced at later date. The 4-cylinder model is added with the SL 43. The SL 43 is rated at  &  which adds an extra  for mild hybrid. This marks the first time the SL-Class is powered by an inline-4 engine since Mercedes-Benz 190 SL.

The car's platform is a wholly AMG developed all-new, aluminum space frame self-supporting body structure that provides significantly more rigidity. Transverse rigidity and longitudinal rigidity are said to be 50% and 40% higher, respectively compared to the GT roadster platform. AMG's chief technical officer, Jochen Hermann, revealed that the new SL shell only weighs .

Technical Data

References

External links

R232
All-wheel-drive vehicles
Cars introduced in 2021
Roadsters
Personal luxury cars
Coupés
Grand tourers
2020s cars